The American rapper G-Eazy has released six studio albums, one compilation album, six mixtapes, nine extended plays and 73 singles (including 24 singles as a featured artist).

Albums

Studio albums

Independent studio albums

Compilation albums

Mixtapes

Extended plays

Singles

As lead artist

As featured artist

Promotional singles

Other charted songs

Guest appearances

Notes

References

Discographies of American artists
Hip hop discographies